KSCE (channel 38) is a religious independent television station in El Paso, Texas, United States, owned by Channel 38 Christian Television. The station's studios are located on Wyoming Avenue (northwest of I-10) in central El Paso, and its transmitter is located atop the Franklin Mountains on the El Paso city limits.

History

The station first signed on the air on April 15, 1989, operating on a non-commercial license. The call letters initially stood for "Saint Clements Episcopal," as the station was originally intended to be an outreach by Saint Clements Episcopal School in downtown El Paso. However, the school lost interest in television broadcasting and the station's controlling board of directors appointed Grace Rendall, a former director at KCIK-TV (channel 14, now KFOX-TV) as the station's manager before KSCE went on the air.

Technical information

Subchannels
The station's digital signal is multiplexed:

Analog-to-digital conversion
KSCE shut down its analog signal, over UHF channel 38, at 6 p.m. on June 12, 2009, the official date in which full-power television stations in the United States transitioned from analog to digital broadcasts under federal mandate. The station's digital signal remained on its pre-transition UHF channel 39. Through the use of PSIP, digital television receivers display the station's virtual channel as its former UHF analog channel 38.

On April 20, 2010, KSCE filed a request for a special temporary authorization with the Federal Communications Commission (FCC) to resume operating an analog signal on UHF channel 38, to broadcast information regarding the dangers to those traveling across the U.S.–Mexico border as a result of the ongoing drug wars in Mexico, on justification that most people in need of the information are unable to afford digital televisions or digital converter boxes. On June 9, 2010, the FCC denied their request to restore their analog signal.

External links

References

Television channels and stations established in 1989
SCE
1989 establishments in Texas
Religious television stations in the United States